Cryphiops is a genus of shrimp belonging to the family Palaemonidae.

The species of this genus are found in Southeastern Asia and Southern America.

Species:

Cryphiops brasiliensis 
Cryphiops caementarius 
Cryphiops luscus 
Cryphiops perspicax 
Cryphiops sbordonii 
Cryphiops villalobosi

References

Palaemonidae